The 2020–21 Israeli Basketball National League (or the Liga Leumit) is the 21st season of the Israeli Basketball National League.

Teams
The following teams had changed divisions after the 2019–20 season:

To National League
Promoted from Liga Artzit
 Hapoel Acre/Mateh Asher
 Maccabi Ironi Ramat Gan

Relegated from Premier League
 Maccabi Ashdod

From National League
Promoted to Premier League
 Hapoel Haifa 
 Bnei Herzliya

Venues and locations

Regular season

League table

Rounds 1 to 30

playouts

Playoffs

source:

Awards

MVP of the Round

References

Israeli
Basketball